The one mil coin was the smallest denomination of the Hong Kong dollar from 1863 to 1866, after this date it was no longer issued but may have circulated much longer. Its value was one tenth of a cent, or a thousandth of a dollar. It was minted by the Royal Mint, it features the Royal cypher of "VR", of the reigning monarch Queen Victoria at the time, but didn't feature a profile of the face of the monarch as all other coins did, due to the hole in the middle.

Design 
The obverse had denomination and country name in the English language. It featured the British crown and the initials 'VR' for Victoria Regina (Latin for Queen Victoria). While coins of the pound sterling have the royal title written in Latin, this is the only use of Latin on British Hong Kong coins. Royal titles were written in English on its other coins.

The reverse had the denomination and country name written in Chinese. During the period 1863-1866, the characters on this side was written as Hong Kong One-wen (香港一文), resembling the Chinese currency of cash at that time period. Among which, the 1866 One-wen is regarded as one of the rarest sample in Hong Kong coinage. Later on in 1866, the Chinese characters was altered to Hong Kong One-thousand (香港一千), indicating the value of a thousandth of a dollar.

Mintages

Hong Kong One-wen variation 
1863: 19,000,000

1864: Unknown

1865: 40,000,000 (Two variations exist - one with a hyphen between HONG and KONG on the obverse, one without hyphen between the two words)

1866: Unknown (Regarded as one of the rarest coin in Hong Kong coinage. One of the samples is stored in the collection of the Melbourne Museum.)

Hong Kong One-thousand variation 
1866: 20,000,000

See also 

 Cash (Chinese coin)

References 

Coins of Hong Kong
1863 establishments in Hong Kong